Ian Wilson (born in 1966) is a Canadian linguist.

Biography
Wilson has a Bachelor of Mathematics from the University of Waterloo, he has an M.A. in Teaching English as a Foreign/Second Language from the University of Birmingham and a PhD in Linguistics (phonetics) from the University of British Columbia.

He is professor at the University of Aizu in Aizuwakamatsu city, Fukushima prefecture, Japan. His field of research is phonetics, especially articulatory phonetics and articulatory setting. He is one of the first teacher/researchers to use ultrasound in a large-scale ESL classroom as a method of providing direct visual biofeedback to pronunciation learners on the movements of the tongue during speech.

Ian Wilson is a co-author of Articulatory Phonetics, which introduces students to the field of Articulatory Phonetics and Speech Science.

References

External links
 Ian Wilson's official website at the University of Aizu
 Ian Wilson's Phonetics Laboratory
 Wiley-Blackwell's Articulatory Phonetics Link

1966 births
Living people
University of Waterloo alumni
Alumni of the University of Birmingham
University of British Columbia alumni
Phoneticians